Kevin Grose (18 June 1954 – 27 November 2012) was an Australian rules footballer who played with Collingwood in the Victorian Football League (VFL).

A Reservoir Old Boy, Grose played as a half back flanker for Collingwood over three league seasons. He played 12 games in 1975 and a further 15 in the 1976 VFL season. By 1977 he was only a fringe player, with Collingwood building a side which would contest that year's grand final.

Grose was then appointed captain-coach of Diamond Valley Football League club North Heidelberg in 1978. He promptly steered them a premiership in his first season in charge, their first flag in 16 years. In 1978 he also was the league's equal leading goal-kicker on 80 goals.

References

1954 births
2012 deaths
Australian rules footballers from Victoria (Australia)
Collingwood Football Club players
North Heidelberg Football Club players